Miembeni Sport Club is a Zanzibari football club based in Unguja.

Achievements
Zanzibar Premier League: 3 
1987, 2007, 2008

Nyerere Cup: 3
1985, 1986, 1987

Mapinduzi Cup: 2
2008, 2009

Kagame Cup: 0

Performance in CAF competitions
CAF Champions League: 2 appearances
2008 – Preliminary Round
2009 – Preliminary Round

CAF Confederation Cup: 1 appearance
2010 – Preliminary Round

African Cup Winners' Cup: 3 appearances
1986 – Second Round
1987 – Second Round
1988 – First Round

References

Football clubs in Tanzania
Zanzibari football clubs
1945 establishments in Zanzibar
Association football clubs established in 1945